Richard Butcher may refer to:

 Richard Butcher (antiquary) (1583–c. 1665), English antiquary
 Richard Butcher (footballer) (1981–2011), English footballer
 Ricky Butcher, a fictional character in EastEnders

See also
 Butcher (surname)